Picot is a surname. Notable people with the name include:
 Auguste Marie Henri Picot de Dampierre (1756–1793), a general of the French Revolution
 Georges Picot (1838–1909), French historian and lawyer
 François Georges-Picot (1870–1951), son of Georges, French diplomat, co-author of the Sykes-Picot Agreement
 Olga Georges-Picot (1940–1977), granddaughter of François, French actress 
 François-Édouard Picot (1786–1868), French painter
 Hajnalka Kiraly Picot (born 1971), French fencer